Ali Akbar Khan (14 April 192218 June 2009) was an Indian Hindustani classical musician of the Maihar gharana, known for his virtuosity in playing the sarod. Trained as a classical musician and instrumentalist by his father, Allauddin Khan, he also composed numerous classical ragas and film scores. He established a music school in Calcutta in 1956, and the Ali Akbar College of Music in 1967, which moved with him to the United States and is now based in San Rafael, California, with a branch in Basel, Switzerland.

Khan was instrumental in popularizing Indian classical music in the West, both as a performer and as a teacher. He first came to America in 1955 on the invitation of violinist Yehudi Menuhin and later settled in California. He was a Distinguished Adjunct Professor of Music at the University of California, Santa Cruz.

Khan was accorded India's second highest civilian honour, the Padma Vibhushan, in 1989. Nominated five times for the Grammy Award, Khan was also a recipient of the MacArthur Fellowship and the National Endowment for the Arts' National Heritage Fellowship.

Childhood and training
Ali Akbar Khan was born in the village of Shibpur, Brahmanbaria, in present-day Bangladesh, to musician and teacher, Allauddin Khan and Madina Begum. Soon after his birth, Khan's family returned to Maihar (in present-day Madhya Pradesh, India) where his father was the primary court musician for the Maharaja of the princely state.

From an early age Khan received training from his father in various instruments as well as vocal composition, but finally gravitated towards the sarod. Allauddin was a perfectionist and a strict taskmaster, and Khan's lessons started before dawn and often lasted 18 hours a day. Khan also learned to play the tabla and the pakhavaj from his uncle, Aftabuddin Khan, who he visited at Shibpur. During this period he met several prominent musicians, such as the sarodist Timir Baran and flautist Pannalal Ghosh, who came to study with his father; in later years he was joined in his lessons by his sister Annapurna Devi, who became an accomplished player of the surbahar, and fellow student Ravi Shankar. Shankar and Annapurna Devi were married in 1941.

Of his training on the sarod, he wrote:

Career

Khan, after years of rigorous training, gave his debut performance at a music conference in Allahabad in 1936, at the age of 13. Three years later, in December 1939, he accompanied Ravi Shankar on the sarod during the latter's debut performance at the same conference; this was the first of many jugalbandis (duets) between the two musicians. In 1938 Khan gave his first recital on All India Radio (AIR), Bombay (accompanied on the tabla by Alla Rakha), and starting in January 1940, he gave monthly performances on AIR, Lucknow. Finally in 1944, both Shankar and Khan left Maihar to start their professional careers as musicians; Shankar went to Bombay, while Khan became the youngest Music Director for AIR, Lucknow, and was responsible for solo performances and composing for the radio orchestra.

In 1943, on his father's recommendation, Khan was appointed a court musician for the Maharaja of Jodhpur, Umaid Singh. There, he taught and composed music besides giving recitals and was accorded the title of Ustad by the Maharaja. When the princely states were wound down with India's independence in 1947 and Maharaja Hanwant Singh died in a plane crash in 1952, Khan moved to Bombay.

In Bombay, he won acclaim as a composer of several film scores, including Chetan Anand's Aandhiyan (1952). Lata Mangeshkar sang the title song, "Har Kahin Pe Shaadmani" and as a token of her respect to sarod maestro, did not charge any fee. This was followed by Satyajit Ray's Devi (1960), Merchant-Ivory's The Householder, and Tapan Sinha's Khudito Pashan ("Hungry Stones", 1960), for which he won the "Best Musician of the Year" award. He also played Sarod for a song in 1955 film Seema which had the music composed by Shankar Jaikishan. Later in 1993, he would score some of the music for Bernardo Bertolucci's Little Buddha.

Beginning in 1945, Khan also started recording a series of 78 rpm disks (which could record about three minutes of music) at the HMV Studios in Bombay. For one such record he conceived a new composition Raga Chandranandan ("moonstruck"), based on four evening ragas, Malkauns, Chandrakauns, Nandakauns and Kaushi Kanada. This record was a huge success in India, and the raga found a worldwide audience, when a 22-minute rendition was re-recorded for the Master Musician of India LP in 1965 − one of Khan's seminal recordings.

He performed in India and traveled extensively in the West. In 1956, Khan founded the Ali Akbar College of Music in Calcutta, with the mission to teach and spread Indian classical music. He founded another school of the same name in Berkeley, California in 1967 and later moved it to San Rafael, California. Khan performed in Boston with Shankar Ghosh in 1969 for the Peabody Mason Concert series.  In 1985 he founded another branch of the Ali Akbar College of Music in Basel, Switzerland. Khan was the first Indian musician to record an LP album of Indian classical music in the United States and to play sarod on American television.

Khan has participated in a number of classic jugalbandi pairings, most notably with Ravi Shankar, Nikhil Banerjee and violinist L. Subramaniam. A few recordings of duets with Vilayat Khan also exist. He also collaborated with Western musicians; he taught Grateful Dead drummers Mickey Hart and, by extension, Bill Kreutzmann. In August 1971, Khan performed at Madison Square Garden for the Concert for Bangladesh, along with Ravi Shankar, Alla Rakha and Kamala Chakravarty; other musicians at the concert included George Harrison, Bob Dylan, Eric Clapton and Ringo Starr. A live album and a movie of the event were later released.

Illness and death
Khan was based in the United States for the last four decades of his life. He toured extensively until he was prevented from doing so by ill health. He had been a dialysis patient since 2004. He died from kidney failure at his home in San Anselmo, California.

Awards
Khan was awarded the Padma Bhushan in 1967 and the Padma Vibhushan in 1989, among other awards. He received a MacArthur Fellowship in 1991, the first Indian musician to receive the so-called "genius grant". In 1997, Khan received the National Endowment for the Arts' prestigious National Heritage Fellowship, the United States' highest honour in the traditional arts. Khan received five Grammy nominations over the course of his life. In September 2014, a postage stamp featuring Khan was released by India Post commemorating his contributions.

Selected discography
Solo albums:
Sound of the Sarod: Recorded in Concert (World Pacific) (recorded in LA, c1962)
The Classical Music of India  (Prestige, 1964)
Bear's Sonic Journals: That Which Colors the Mind (Owsley Stanley Foundation, 2020)

With Ravi Shankar:
The Master Musicians of India (Prestige, 1964)

With John Handy:
Karuna Supreme (MPS, 1976)
Rainbow (MPS, 1981)

References

Cited sources

External links

Ali Akbar College of Music

1922 births
2009 deaths
Bengali musicians
Deaths from kidney failure
Hindustani instrumentalists
Indian film score composers
MacArthur Fellows
Maihar gharana
National Heritage Fellowship winners
People from Comilla District
Pupils of Allauddin Khan
Recipients of the Padma Bhushan in arts
Recipients of the Padma Vibhushan in arts
Recipients of the Sangeet Natak Akademi Fellowship
Sarod players
Indian Muslims
20th-century Indian male classical singers
Recipients of the Sangeet Natak Akademi Award